The First Missouri Brigade was an infantry brigade that served in the Confederate States Army during the American Civil War. It was mostly recruited from members of the Missouri State Guard – a secessionist force formed from the Missouri Volunteer Militia when the allegiance of the state was disputed.

The brigade was first formed during the winter of 1861–62 as the first brigade of the division commanded by Sterling Price. It was initially led and drilled by Lewis Henry Little. In September 1862, Little was promoted to command of the division and the brigade was then commanded by Elijah Gates. In March 1863, Francis Cockrell took command of the brigade and led it for most of the remaining war. The unit had its last stand under Col. James McCown at the Battle of Fort Blakeley in April 1865.

See also
 List of Missouri Confederate Civil War units

References

1862 establishments in Missouri
1865 disestablishments in Alabama
Units and formations of the Confederate States Army from Missouri
Military units and formations established in 1862
Military units and formations disestablished in 1865
Brigades of the Confederate States Army